Corio may refer to:

Corio, Piedmont, a commune in the province of Turin, northern Italy
Corio, Victoria, a residential and industrial area in Geelong, Victoria, Australia
Division of Corio, an Australian electoral division in the state of Victoria
Corio (company), a Dutch real estate investment company
Corio (surname), an Italian surname